The Heinrich H. Schroeder Barn is a historic barn at 632 29th Avenue in Canton, Kansas, United States.  It was built in 1915 and added to the National Register of Historic Places in 2005.

The barn once had two cupolas, but those were lost in a 1946 tornado.

It was built by Heinrich H. Schroeder, a Mennonite born in Russia.

References

Barns on the National Register of Historic Places in Kansas
Buildings and structures in McPherson County, Kansas
Barns in Kansas
National Register of Historic Places in McPherson County, Kansas
Barns with hay hoods